Jerónimo Elavoko Wanga was a member of the Pan-African Parliament from Angola, beginning in 2004  till his death in 2007.

He was a member of the transition Government as minister of Education, in 1975. Jerónimo Wanga was second-vice-president of the National Assembly, where he was, among other functions, the chief of the parliamentary group of UNITA. 

Graduated in Mathematics and professionally a teacher, was born in 24 of April of 1934, in the province of Bié, and was elected in the electoral circle of that province.

See also
 List of members of the Pan-African Parliament

References

Members of the Pan-African Parliament from Angola
Living people
Year of birth missing (living people)